Michael Cardenas (born July 14, 1933) is an American businessman who served as Administrator of the Small Business Administration from 1981 to 1982.

References

1933 births
Living people
Administrators of the Small Business Administration
California Republicans